Johnny-on-the-Spot is a 1919 American silent comedy film. Directed by Harry L. Franklin, the film stars Hale Hamilton, Louise Lovely, and Philo McCullough. It was released on February 17, 1919.

Cast list
 Hale Hamilton as Johnny Rutledge
 Louise Lovely as Anne Travers
 Philo McCullough as Arthur Abington, aka Cooley
 Ruth Orlamond as Mrs. Webster
 Edward J. Connelly as Judge Martin Crandall
 Hardee Kirkland as Dr. Barnabas Bunyon
 Lila Leslie as Lillian Dupre (credited as Lilie Leslie)
 E. N. Wallack as Jim Burton
 Fred H. Warren as Pipe Brooks
 Neal Hardin as Buck Bates
 Oral Humphreys as Canary Kelly

References

External links

American silent feature films
American black-and-white films
Films directed by Harry L. Franklin
Metro Pictures films
Silent American comedy films
1919 comedy films
1919 films
1910s English-language films
1910s American films